Bunburra is a rural locality in the Scenic Rim Region, Queensland, Australia.

History 
Bunburra Provisional School opened on 8 July 1889. On 1 January 1909, it became Bunburra State School. It closed in 1946.

The locality contains 43 households, in which 53.3% of the population are males and 46.7% of the population are females with a median age of 55, 17 years above the national average. The average weekly household income is $1,187, $251 below the national average.

Education 
There are no schools in Bunburra. The nearest government primary schools are Boonah State School in Boonah to the north and Mount Alford State School in Mount Alford to the west. The nearest government secondary school is Boonah State High School in Boonah.

References 

Scenic Rim Region
Localities in Queensland